Saša Zečević (born 20 November 1983) is a Serbia footballer (central defender) who plays as for FK Borac Sajkas in the Novi Sad Football League.

Club career 
In December 2014, he signed with Gresik United.

References

External links
 Profile - at Goal
 
 Profile - at VIVAbola

1983 births
Living people
Serbian footballers
Expatriate footballers in Indonesia
Association football defenders
Footballers from Novi Sad
FK Vojvodina players
NK Žepče players
FK Rudar Prijedor players
FK Laktaši players
Persiwa Wamena players
PSMS Medan players
Liga 1 (Indonesia) players
Persegres Gresik players
Gresik United players
Southern Myanmar F.C. players